Franz Xaver Krautwurst (7 August 1923 – 30 November 2015) was a German musicologist and academic teacher	.

Life 

Born in Munich, In addition to his many years as professor at the University of Erlangen-Nuremberg and the University of Augsburg, Krautwurst excelled in musicological regional research and founded and established this as an important branch of musicology.
Krautwurst was editor of the Neues Musikwissenschaftliches Jahrbuch and emerged as author of other writings. In addition, Krautwurst was instrumental in the  researching the biography of the composer Valentin Rathgeber.

Krautwurst died in Erlangen at the age of 92.

Work (selection)
 Franz Krautwurst: Rathgeber, Johann Valentin. In Die Musik in Geschichte und Gegenwart. Vol 7. Kassel 1989. .

Awards 

 1961: 
 2007:  of the Mittelfranken district
 2008: Order of Merit of the Federal Republic of Germany
 Honorary membership of the Internationale Valentin-Rathgeber-Gesellschaft

References

External links 
 
 Horst Leuchtmann: Quaestiones in musica. Festschrift für Franz Krautwurst zum 65. Geburtstag (with Friedhelm Brusniak), Tutzing 1989

German publishers (people)
20th-century German musicologists
Academic staff of the University of Augsburg
Recipients of the Cross of the Order of Merit of the Federal Republic of Germany
1923 births
2015 deaths
Writers from Munich